Deklan Terrence Wynne (born 20 March 1995) is a New Zealand footballer who plays as a left back for USL Championship side Charleston Battery, and the New Zealand national team. He was born in Johannesburg, South Africa, and emigrated to New Zealand in January 2010, aged 14. The eligibility of his inclusion in an Olympic qualifying game in 2015 was successfully challenged and cost New Zealand the chance of participating in the 2016 Olympic Games.

Club career
Wynne signed for Wanderers SC from East Coast Bays AFC in 2013. On 13 August 2015 Wynne signed with United Soccer League side Whitecaps FC 2. Whitecaps traded Wynne to Colorado Rapids on 21 December 2017, in exchange for $100,000 of Targeted Allocation Money. Wynne was released by Colorado following their 2020 season. Wynne signed with Phoenix Rising FC of the USL Championship on January 14, 2021. Wynne was loaned to fellow USL Championship side OKC Energy on 1 July 2021.

On 28 January 2022, Wynne signed with Detroit City ahead of their inaugural USL Championship season.

On 3 January 2023, Wynne made the move to USL Chmpionship side Charleston Battery on a multi-year deal.

International career
Wynne first represented New Zealand at senior level, his international debut came against China in November 2014 having been called up due to injuries to Louis Fenton, and Tom Doyle. Wynne provided the assist for Chris Wood to equalise at 1–1. He made further international appearances against Thailand four days later, and in March 2015, he played against South Korea.

Wynne was selected for the New Zealand national under-20 team to play at the 2015 U-20 World Cup in May 2015. He played in all possible matches for New Zealand; three group stage games against Ukraine U-20, United States U-20, Myanmar U-20 and a Round of 16 loss against Portugal U-20.

Two months later, Wynne was again selected by the New Zealand national under-23 team, known as the "Oly Whites" for the 2015 Pacific Games football tournament, he played in the final group stage game against New Caledonia. As non-Pacific Games Council members, New Zealand were not able to qualify for the Pacific Games semi-final, but as members of FIFA and IOC were able to qualify for the 2016 Summer Olympics qualifying semi-final stage. Wynne played in the semi-final, which New Zealand won 2–0 against Vanuatu. After the game, a protest was lodged by the opponents on the basis that Wynne was not an eligible player. A 3–0 victory was awarded to Vanuatu who went on to lose the Olympic qualifying final stage against Fiji on penalties after a 0–0 draw.

Eligibility
Vanuatu formally protested the eligibility of Wynne following their 2–0 loss at the semi-final stage of the Olympic Qualifying section in which Wynne featured. OFC awarded a 3–0 victory to Vanuatu after finding that Wynne was ineligible to play in the Olympic qualifying rounds.

New Zealand Football announced that they would be challenging the decision, claiming that the Pacific Games Council confirmed the eligibility of the squad in advance of the tournament and that they acted in "good faith". To be eligible for the New Zealand representative team, Wynne, or a parent or grandparent would need to have been born in New Zealand, or he would have needed to have become a New Zealand citizen before the age of 18 – the age when FIFA's requirement for a player to live on the territory of the football association for five years would take effect. An appeal to the OFC against their expulsion from Olympic qualifying was rejected in October 2015. In January 2016, New Zealand Football successfully applied for an exemption from the FIFA eligibility requirements, making Wynne eligible to play for New Zealand.

References

External links
 
 
 
 

Living people
1995 births
South African emigrants to New Zealand
New Zealand association footballers
Sportspeople from Johannesburg
Association football defenders
Wanderers Special Club players
Whitecaps FC 2 players
Vancouver Whitecaps FC players
Colorado Rapids players
Phoenix Rising FC players
OKC Energy FC players
Detroit City FC players
Charleston Battery players
New Zealand Football Championship players
USL Championship players
Major League Soccer players
New Zealand under-20 international footballers
New Zealand under-23 international footballers
New Zealand international footballers
2017 FIFA Confederations Cup players
New Zealand expatriate association footballers
Expatriate soccer players in Canada
New Zealand expatriate sportspeople in Canada
Expatriate soccer players in the United States
New Zealand expatriate sportspeople in the United States